= Theograph =

A theograph (or theoplot) is a type of graph to visualise patient journeys. It has also been used in education.

== Structure ==
Theographs are a type of longitudinal history or health and care event timeline in a graphical form. They show the contacts an individual has with different services over time. Time is shown on x-axis, while different symbols represent different types of contact on the y-axis.
